Leacy is a surname. Notable people with the surname include:

Mary Leacy (born 1987), Irish camogie player
Una Leacy (born 1988), Irish camogie player

See also
Lacy
Leary (surname)

Toponymic surnames